Charles Pickering Bowditch (September 30, 1842 – June 1, 1921) was an American financier, archaeologist, cryptographer and linguistics scholar who specialized in Mayan epigraphy.

Bowditch was born in Boston into the Massachusetts Bowditch family of mathematician Nathaniel Bowditch, his grandfather, and physiologist Henry Pickering Bowditch, his brother, son of Jonathan Ingersoll Bowditch and Lucy Orme Nichols.  He received his undergraduate degree in 1863 and his master's in 1866, both from Harvard University. During the American Civil War he served as an officer in the 55th Massachusetts Volunteer Infantry, a colored regiment, rising to the rank of captain, and then served as a captain in the 5th Massachusetts Volunteer Cavalry, also a colored regiment. In 1866, he married Cornelia L. Rockwell who bore him four children who survived him. He died in 1921 in Jamaica Plain, Massachusetts, and was buried with a Unitarian service.

As a businessman Bowditch participated unsuccessfully in the Pennsylvania oil rush and returned to Massachusetts to manage the estate of Mrs. William Wadsworth, which gave him experience as a financial trustee. He went on to manage many trusts, was a director of the Massachusetts Cotton Mills and the Pepperell Manufacturing Company, the Boston and Providence Railroad Company, American Bell Telephone Company, and a director and later president of the Massachusetts Hospital Life Insurance Company. For three years he was vice-president of the American Bell Telephone Company.

In 1888, Bowditch took a trip to the Yucatán and southern Mexico and became interested in the Mayan culture. While he funded much Mayan research, his own Mayan work focused on deciphering Mayan epigraphy and their calendar system. He was one of the founders of the American Anthropological Association.  In 1891 Bowditch was elected a member of the American Antiquarian Society.

Harvard and the Peabody Museum

Bowditch made his first donation to Harvard's Peabody Museum in 1888, and during his life was its largest contributor. Beginning in 1891, Bowditch funded numerous expeditions to the Mayan areas of Central America through the museum, almost one per year until his death. In 1894 he was elected a trustee of the museum and served on its faculty. On his death he left a large collection of books and other materials on the languages of Central America and Mexico to the museum.

Among the expeditions that Bowditch funded were those of:
John G. Owens at Copán,
George Byron Gordon at Copán
Marshall Howard Saville at Copán
Teoberto Maler in the el Petén region of Guatemala and along the course of the Usumacinta River
Edward Herbert Thompson at Chichen Itza and elsewhere in the Yucatán
Alfred Marston Tozzer in British Honduras and northern Guatemala
Raymond E. Merwin in British Honduras and northern Guatemala,
Clarence L. Hay in British Honduras and northern Guatemala,
Samuel Kirkland Lothrop in Honduras
Sylvanus Griswold Morley, second expedition to the Yucatán, and
Herbert Joseph Spinden in the southern Yucatán
Bowditch endowed a chair (a professorship) at Harvard in archaeology.

AAAS

Bowditch was treasurer of the American Academy of Arts and Sciences from 1905 to 1915 and went on to serve as president from 1917 to 1919.

Selected works
Mexican and Central American antiquities, calendar systems, and history (1904)
The Numeration, Calendar Systems and Astronomical Knowledge of  the Mayans (1910)
Bacon's Connection with the First Folio of Shakespeare
Translation of Landa's Relación de las cosas de Yucatán
Translation of Avendaño's Relación

Memberships
American Academy of Arts and Sciences
American Anthropological Association
American Antiquarian Society
American Geographical Society
Archaeological Institute of America
The Bostonian Society
Boston Society of Natural History
the Colonial Society of Massachusetts
International Congress of Americanists
Massachusetts Historical Society
Massachusetts Horticultural Society
New England Historic Genealogical Society
Société des Américanistes de Paris

Notes

External links

 
 

1842 births
1921 deaths
American archaeologists
Mayanists
Philanthropists from Massachusetts
Francis Bacon scholars
American chief executives of financial services companies
American cryptographers
American financiers
Harvard University alumni
Harvard University faculty
American expatriates in Mexico
Members of the American Antiquarian Society